Chloroclystis manusela is a moth in the  family Geometridae. It is found on Seram.

References

Moths described in 1929
Chloroclystis
Moths of Indonesia